Cuscuta monogyna, the eastern dodder, is a species of annual herb in the family Convolvulaceae. They are climbers and have simple, broad leaves.

Sources

References 

monogyna
Flora of Malta